Fastiv I is the main railway station in Fastiv, Ukraine.

Railway stations in Kyiv Oblast
Railway stations opened in 1870
Fastiv Raion